The following is the list of ambassadors from Turkey. The list is in alphabetical order by country. In brackets are the countries for which the embassy is responsible on non-residential basis.

List of ambassadors

 — Süphan Erkula
 — Ozan Ceyhun
Consul General Ayşe Nilüfer Feyizoğlu in Bregenz
Consul General Nesrin Bayazıt in Salzburg
Consul General Sedat Önal in Vienna
 — Hulusi Kılıç
Consul General Mehmet Bilir in Nakhchivan City
 — Veka İnal
 — Nazif Murat Ersavcı
Consul General Mehmet Poroy in Brussels
Consul General Ahmet Arda in Antwerp
 — Bülent Tulun
Consul General Ali Davutoğlu in Mostar
 — Ersin Erçin 
 — Mehmet Gücük
Consul General Vural Altay in Burgas
Consul General Ümit Yalçın in Plovdiv
 — Ali Kemal Aydın
 — Şaban Dişli
 — Mehmet Vakur Erkul

List of ambassadors to international organizations
 — Mehmet Kemal Bozay in Brussels
 Council of Europe — Kaan Esener in Strasbourg
 — Feridun Sinirlioğlu in New York City
NATO — Basat Öztürk in Brussels
OECD — Erdem Başçı in Paris
OSCE — Rauf Engin Soysal in Vienna
WTO — Kemal Madenoğlu in Geneva
 UN Office — Sadık Arslan in Geneva
 UN Office — Ahmet Muhtar Gün in Vienna
 UNESCO — Ahmet Altay Cengizer in Paris
 ICAO — Suat Hayri Aka in Montreal

References

External links
Turkish Ministry of Foreign Affairs
Turkish Embassy List

See also
Foreign relations of Turkey
List of diplomatic missions of Turkey
List of Ambassadors to Turkey

Turkey
Main
Turkey diplomacy-related lists